Aluminium phosphide is a highly toxic inorganic compound with the chemical formula AlP, used as a wide band gap semiconductor and a fumigant. This colorless solid is generally sold as a grey-green-yellow powder due to the presence of impurities arising from hydrolysis and oxidation.

Properties 

Aluminium phosphide reacts with water or acids to release phosphine:
AlP + 3 H2O → Al(OH)3 + PH3
AlP + 3 H+ → Al3+ + PH3

Preparation 
AlP is synthesized by combination of the elements:

 4Al + P4 → 4AlP

Caution must be taken to avoid exposing the AlP to any sources of moisture, as this generates toxic phosphine gas. Phosphine also poses fire hazards, as it is a dangerous pyrophoric compound, igniting easily in air.

Uses

Pesticide 
AlP is used as a rodenticide, insecticide, and fumigant for stored cereal grains. It is used to kill small verminous mammals such as moles and rodents. The tablets or pellets, known as "wheat pills", typically also contain other chemicals that evolve ammonia which helps to reduce the potential for spontaneous ignition or explosion of the phosphine gas.

AlP is used as both a fumigant and an oral pesticide. As a rodenticide, aluminium phosphide pellets are provided as a mixture with food for consumption by the rodents. The acid in the digestive system of the rodent reacts with the phosphide to generate the toxic phosphine gas. Other pesticides similar to aluminium phosphide are zinc phosphide and calcium phosphide. In this application, aluminium phosphide can be encountered under various brand names, e.g. Quickphos, Celphos, Fostox, Fumitoxin, Phostek, Phostoxin, Talunex, Fieldphos, and Weevil-Cide. It generates phosphine gas according to the following hydrolysis equation.

2 AlP + 6 H2O → Al2O3∙3 H2O + 2 PH3

It is used as a fumigant when other pesticide applications are impractical and when structures and installations are being treated, such as in ships, aircraft, and grain silos. All of these structures can be effectively sealed or enclosed in a gastight membrane, thereby containing and concentrating the phosphine fumes. Fumigants are also applied directly to rodent burrows.

Semiconductor applications 
Industrially, AlP is a semiconductor material that is usually alloyed with other binary materials for applications in devices such as light-emitting diodes (e.g. aluminium gallium indium phosphide).

Toxicology 

Highly poisonous, aluminium phosphide has been used for suicide. Fumigation has also caused unintentional deaths. Known as "rice tablet" in Iran, for its use to preserve rice, there have been frequent incidents of accidental or intentional death. There is a campaign by the Iranian Forensic Medicine Organization to stop its use as a pesticide.

Recycling of used aluminium phosphide containers caused the death of three family members in Alcalá de Guadaira, Spain. They had been keeping them in plastic sacks in their bathroom.  The deaths occurred accidentally due to aluminium phosphide reacting with water or moisture, and becoming phosphine, leading to their death within hours.

Aluminium phosphide poisoning is considered a wide-scale problem in the Indian subcontinent.

References 

Aluminium compounds
Phosphides
III-V semiconductors
Inorganic insecticides
Rodenticides
III-V compounds
Zincblende crystal structure